The Kürpsay Dam is a gravity dam on the river Naryn in Jalal-Abad Region, Kyrgyzstan, downstream from the Toktogul Dam. The installed capacity of the power station is 800 MW. Construction was started in 1976, and the first electricity was supplied in 1981.

References

Hydroelectric power stations in Kyrgyzstan
Dams in Kyrgyzstan
Hydroelectric power stations built in the Soviet Union
Dams completed in 1976
Dams on the Naryn River
Gravity dams
Energy infrastructure completed in 1976